Nada Es Imposible is the first album in Spanish by Australian contemporary worship band Planetshakers. They worked with Joth Hunt in the production of this album. Nada Es Imposible in Spanish, was released by Planetshakers Ministries International and Integrity Music on 1 July 2014, the album debuted at No. 17 on the Billboard "Latin Pop Albums" chart. The album includes a selection of 11 songs by Planetshakers translated and recorded in Spanish featuring guest vocals from Lucía Parker on the title track.

Release and promotion
The title track of the album, "Nada Es Imposible" (feat. Lucía Parker), was released on June 23, 2014 as the title track, when the pre-order of the album began. The album Nada Es Imposible in Spanish, was released by Planetshakers Ministries International and Integrity Music on 1 July 2014. Nada Es Imposible is the first album by Planetshakers to be recorded in Spanish.

Critical reception

A staff editor at Amazon.com gave the album a relatively positive review, writing, the album Nada Es Imposible is "Led by Russell and Sam Evans, Planetshakers is the fastest growing church in Australia."

Awards and accolades
This album has been nominated by the Arpa Awards (México, 2014) in three categories: best group or duo album, album rock or hard rock and producer of 2014.

Commercial performance
In the United States, Nada Es Imposible debuted at No. 17 on the Latin Pop Albums chart dated 19 July 2014 published by Billboard.

Track listing

NOTE:  These songs are Spanish-language translations of Planetshakers songs in English.  The original English-language song is listed next to each title.

Personnel
Adapted from AllMusic.

 Planetshakers – primary artist 
 Jonathan Hunt – Worship leader, composer, A&R, mixing, producer
 Samantha Evans – Worship leader, executive producer
 Rudy Nikkerud – Worship leader
 Chelsi Nikkerud – Worship leader
 Brian "BJ" Pridham – Worship leader, composer
 Natalie Ruiz – Worship leader
 Lucía Parker – vocals, vocals producer, featured Artist, translation
 Andy Harrison – composer
 Henry Seeley – composer
 Liz Webber – composer
 Joshua Brown – Artist development
 Craig Dunnagan – Artist development
 Chico Gonzalez – Artist development
 Matthew Gray – Mastering
 Samuel Koh – artwork design
 Mike Webber – project coordinator
 Mike Pilmer – project coordinator
 C. Ryan Dunham – executive producer
 Russell Evans – executive producer

Chart performance
Nada Es Imposible debuted at #14 on the US iTunes Latino Charts.

References

2014 albums
Spanish-language albums
Planetshakers albums
Christian music albums by Australian artists